The 2023 New York Life ACC Men's Basketball Tournament was the postseason men's basketball tournament for the Atlantic Coast Conference held at the Greensboro Coliseum in Greensboro, North Carolina, from March 7 to 11, 2023. It was the 70th annual edition of the tournament. The Duke Blue Devils won the tournament, their twenty-second ACC Tournament title, receiving the conference's automatic bid to the 2023 NCAA tournament. The tournament marked the last game of Jim Boeheim's 47 year coaching career at Syracuse.

Seeds

All 15 ACC teams participated in the tournament. Teams were seeded by record within the conference, with a tiebreaker system to seed teams with identical conference records.

Schedule

Bracket

Game summaries

First round

Second round
Davien Williamson hits the game winning 3 with 0.2 seconds left.

This was the last game Jim Boeheim coached, as he retired following the loss.

Quarterfinals

Semifinals

Final

Awards and honors

See also
 2023 ACC women's basketball tournament

References

Tournament
ACC men's basketball tournament
Basketball competitions in Greensboro, North Carolina
College basketball tournaments in North Carolina
ACC men's basketball tournament
ACC men's basketball tournament